A foulard is a lightweight fabric, either twill or plain-woven, made of silk or a mix of silk and cotton.  Foulards usually have a small printed design of various colors.  Foulard can also refer by metonymy to articles of clothing, such as scarves and neckties, made from this fabric. In men's ties, foulard refers to the pattern rather than the material; it is a small-scale pattern with basic block repeat, also called a set pattern or a tailored pattern.

Foulard is believed to have originated in East Asia. The word comes from the French word foulard, with the same proper and metonymic meanings. In modern French, foulard is the usual word  for a neckerchief. In Quebec foulard is also used for scarf (écharpe in France).

Foulard fabric is also used in home décor wall coverings.

References

Woven fabrics
Silk